Milan Rock is a rock along the eastern margin of Land Glacier,  southeast of Mount Hartkopf, in Marie Byrd Land, Antarctica. It is the southernmost outcrop near the head of the glacier. The feature was mapped by the United States Geological Survey from surveys and U.S. Navy aerial photography, 1959–65, and was named by the Advisory Committee on Antarctic Names for Frederick T. Milan, aviation structural mechanic, U.S. Navy, a member of Squadron VX-6 air crew on LC-130 aircraft for several seasons, and a crew member on the first midwinter flight to Antarctica, June 25, 1964.

References

Rock formations of Marie Byrd Land